In respiratory physiology, the oxygen cascade describes the flow of oxygen from air to mitochondria. Oxygen flows from areas with high partial pressure of oxygen (PO2, also known as oxygen tension) to areas of lower PO2.

Air is typically around 21% oxygen, and at sea level, the PO2 of air is typically around 159 mmHg. Humidity dilutes the concentration of oxygen in air. As air is breathed into the lungs, it mixes with water and exhaust gasses including CO2, further diluting the oxygen concentration and lowering the PO2. As oxygen continues to flow from areas of higher concentration to lower concentration, it passes many barriers such as the alveoli, capillary walls, capillary plasma, red blood cell walls, interstitial space, other cell walls, and cell cytoplasm. The partial pressure of oxygen drops across each barrier.

Table 1 gives the example of a typical oxygen cascade for a skeletal muscle of healthy, adult male at rest who is breathing air at atmospheric pressure. Actual values in a person may vary widely due to ambient conditions, health status, tissue type, and metabolic demands.

References 

Respiratory physiology
Cell biology